In polymer chemistry, ring-opening polymerization (ROP) is a form of chain-growth polymerization, in which the terminus of a polymer chain attacks cyclic monomers to form a longer polymer (see figure). The reactive center can be radical, anionic or cationic. Some cyclic monomers such as norbornene or cyclooctadiene can be polymerized to high molecular weight polymers by using metal catalysts. ROP is a versatile method for the synthesis of biopolymers.

Ring-opening of cyclic monomers is often driven by the relief of bond-angle strain. Thus, as is the case for other types of polymerization, the enthalpy change in ring-opening is negative.

Monomers
Cyclic monomers that are amenable to ROP include epoxides, cyclic trisiloxanes, some lactones, lactides, cyclic carbonates, and amino acid N-carboxyanhydrides. Many strained cycloalkenes, e.g norbornene, are suitable monomers via ring-opening metathesis polymerization.

History
Ring-opening polymerization has been used since the beginning of the 1900s to produce polymers. Synthesis of polypeptides which has the oldest history of ROP, dates back to the work in 1906 by Leuchs.  Subsequently, the ROP of anhydro sugars provided polysaccharides, including synthetic dextran, xanthan gum, welan gum, gellan gum, diutan gum, and pullulan. Mechanisms and thermodynamics of ring-opening polymerization were established in the 1950s.  The first high-molecular weight polymers (Mn up to 105) with a repeating unit were prepared by ROP as early as in 1976.

An industrial application is the production of nylon-6.

Mechanisms
Ring-opening polymerization can proceed via radical, anionic, or cationic polymerization as described below.  Additionally, radical ROP is useful in producing polymers with functional groups incorporated in the backbone chain that cannot otherwise be synthesized via conventional chain-growth polymerization of vinyl monomers. For instance, radical ROP can produce polymers with ethers, esters, amides, and carbonates as functional groups along the main chain.

Anionic ring-opening polymerization (AROP)

Anionic ring-opening polymerizations (AROP) involve nucleophilic reagents as initiators. Monomers with a three-member ring structure - such as epoxides, aziridines, and episulfides - undergo anionic ROP.

A typical example of anionic ROP is that of ε-caprolactone, initiated by an alkoxide.

Cationic ring-opening polymerization

Cationic initiators and intermediates characterize cationic ring-opening polymerization (CROP).  Examples of cyclic monomers that polymerize through this mechanism include lactones, lactams, amines, and ethers. CROP proceeds through an SN1 or SN2 propagation, chain-growth process.  The mechanism is affected by the stability of the resulting cationic species.  For example, if the atom bearing the positive charge is stabilized by electron-donating groups, polymerization will proceed by the SN1 mechanism.   The cationic species is a heteroatom and the chain grows by the addition of cyclic monomers thereby opening the ring system.

The monomers can be activated by Bronsted acids, carbenium ions, onium ions, and metal cations.

CROP can be a living polymerization and can be terminated by nucleophilic reagents such as phenoxy anions, phosphines, or polyanions. When the amount of monomers becomes depleted, termination can occur intra or intermolecularly.  The active end can "backbite" the chain, forming a macrocycle.  Alkyl chain transfer is also possible, where the active end is quenched by transferring an alkyl chain to another polymer.

Ring-opening metathesis polymerization

Ring-opening metathesis polymerization (ROMP) produces unsaturated polymers from cycloalkenes or bicycloalkenes.  It requires organometallic catalysts.

The mechanism for ROMP follows similar pathways as olefin metathesis.  The initiation process involves the coordination of the cycloalkene monomer to the metal alkylidene complex, followed by a [2+2] type cycloaddition to form the metallacyclobutane intermediate that cycloreverts to form a new alkylidene species.  
 Commercially relevant unsaturated polymers synthesized by ROMP include Norsorex (polynorbornene), Vestenamer (polycyclooctene), and Metton (polycyclopentadiene).

Thermodynamics
The formal thermodynamic criterion of a given monomer polymerizability is related to a sign of the free enthalpy (Gibbs free energy) of polymerization:

where x and y indicate monomer and polymer states, respectively (x and/or y = l (liquid), g (gaseous), c (amorphous solid), c’ (crystalline solid), s (solution)), ΔHp(xy) and ΔSp(xy) are the corresponding enthalpy (SI unit: joule per kelvin) and entropy (SI unit: joule) of polymerization, and T is the absolute temperature (SI unit: kelvin).
The free enthalpy of polymerization (ΔGp) may be expressed as a sum of standard enthalpy of polymerization (ΔGp°) and a term related to instantaneous monomer molecules and growing macromolecules concentrations: 

where R is the gas constant, M is the monomer, (m)i is the monomer in an initial state, and m* is the active monomer.
Following Flory–Huggins solution theory that the reactivity of an active center, located at a macromolecule of a sufficiently long macromolecular chain, does not depend on its degree of polymerization (DPi), and taking in to account that ΔGp° = ΔHp° - TΔSp° (where ΔHp° and ΔSp° indicate a standard polymerization enthalpy and entropy, respectively), we obtain:  

At equilibrium (ΔGp = 0), when polymerization is complete the monomer concentration ([M]eq) assumes a value determined by standard polymerization parameters (ΔHp° and ΔSp°) and polymerization temperature:

Polymerization is possible only when [M]0 > [M]eq. Eventually, at or above the so-called ceiling temperature (Tc), at which [M]eq = [M]0, formation of the high polymer does not occur. 

For example, tetrahydrofuran (THF) cannot be polymerized above Tc = 84 °C, nor cyclo-octasulfur (S8) below Tf = 159 °C.  However, for many monomers, Tc and Tf, for polymerization in the bulk, are well above or below the operable polymerization temperatures, respectively.
The polymerization of a majority of monomers is accompanied by an entropy decrease, due mostly to the loss in the translational degrees of freedom. In this situation, polymerization is thermodynamically allowed only when the enthalpic contribution into ΔGp prevails (thus, when ΔHp° < 0 and ΔSp° < 0, the inequality |ΔHp| > -TΔSp is required). Therefore, the higher the ring strain, the lower the resulting monomer concentration at equilibrium.

See also
 Ring opening metathesis polymerization
 Olefin Metathesis Polymerization

Additional reading

</ref>

</ref>

References 

Polymerization reactions